Kubi Chaza Indi is a Zimbabwean development activist and businesswoman. Under her maiden name, Kubi Chaza, she was an actress in the United Kingdom, appearing in Live and Let Die in 1973 as a sales clerk serving James Bond. After returning to Zimbabwe, she and actor husband John Indi started a company making beauty products.

Background
Indi is very active in the development community, particularly with respect to issues affecting women, and is secretary-general of the Indigenous Business Women's Organisation in Zimbabwe.

The Indis have continued to work in film-making, John as an actor, but Kubi on both sides of the camera. In 1989, she produced I Am the Future, a film about a young woman (played by Stella Chiweshe) who travels to the big city to escape Zimbabwe's independence war in the rural areas. In 1993, she played the eponymous heroine's modern neighbour in Neria, Tsitsi Dangarembga's script about widowhood in Zimbabwe. Both films were directed by Godwin Mawuru, and Neria featured a soundtrack by Oliver Mtukudzi.

Indi is a member of the Women Filmmakers of Zimbabwe.

Career
Her role as the sales girl in the Oh Cult Voodoo shop came about when she was in the UK, and she got to play the part. Her character as the sales girl serves James Bond (played by Roger Moore), wraps an item for him and then rings the Mister Big when Bond leaves the shop.

After Zimbabwe became independent, Indi and her husband John  returned to the country. There they started their beauty products company called Kubi Cosmetics. It is now a well-known brand in Southern Africa. It makes products that specifically for African skin and  hair.

Select filmography
Toomorrow (1970) - Sylvana
Live and Let Die (1973) - sales clerk (Oh Cult Voodoo Shop, 33 E 65th St, New York City, New York 10065)
Love Thy Neighbour (1973) - first black girl
Royal Flash (1975) - Lucy
Neria (1993) - Connie (final film role)
Shaina (2020) - Rooster Gogo

References

Further reading 
 

 

Africa Film & TV Details of I Am the Future
Variety Review of Neria

Theatre in Zimbabwe
Zimbabwean businesspeople
Zimbabwean activists
Zimbabwean women activists
Zimbabwean film actresses
Zimbabwean emigrants to the United Kingdom
Living people
Year of birth missing (living people)
Zimbabwean women in business
21st-century Zimbabwean actresses
20th-century Zimbabwean actresses